The Rukwa Rift Basin, located in southwestern Tanzania, is an endorheic rift basin that contains Lake Rukwa. It forms part of the East African Rift system and has produced a number of Cretaceous and Oligocene fossils.

Stratigraphy

References 

Sedimentary basins of Africa
Paleontological sites of Africa
Geology of Tanzania